Zhang Shan (born March 23, 1968) is a Chinese sports shooter and Olympic champion.

Career
Zhang Shan was born in the city of Nanchong in Sichuan province in Southwest China. She began shooting skeet at age 16. In 1989, she joined the Chinese national skeet team. She won the gold medal in the Olympic Skeet Shooting event at the 1992 Summer Olympics in Barcelona. This event had been mixed, open to both men and women, since it was introduced to the olympics in 1968. Zhang Shan's 1992 gold was the first medal won by a woman in this mixed event. The International Shooting Union consequently barred women from the 1996 Atlanta games. For the 2000 Sydney games, the International Olympic committee allowed women again, but only in segregated competition. Zhang participated in the 2000 Olympic women's skeet placing 8th. She had won the title at seventh National Game in 1993. Zhang won the title at Lonato World Shooting Championship in 2005.

She won a gold medal with the Chinese team in the women's skeet (team event) at the 2007 World Shotgun Championships in Nicosia. She took part in the 2010 ISSF World Shooting Championships in Munich, where she placed 15th in individual skeet. Her later achievements includes a silver medal in 2017 at the 13th Chinese National Games, at the age of 49, 25 years after her Olympic gold medal.

Olympic results

Records

References

External links
 

1968 births
Living people
Olympic gold medalists for China
Olympic shooters of China
People from Nanchong
Shooters at the 1992 Summer Olympics
Sichuan University alumni
Asian Games medalists in shooting
Olympic medalists in shooting
Sport shooters from Sichuan
Shooters at the 1990 Asian Games
Shooters at the 2010 Asian Games
Chinese female sport shooters
Medalists at the 1992 Summer Olympics
Asian Games gold medalists for China
Medalists at the 1990 Asian Games
Medalists at the 2010 Asian Games
21st-century Chinese women